Glacidorbis hedleyi is a species of minute freshwater snail with an operculum, an aquatic gastropod mollusc or micromollusc in the family Glacidorbidae.

Glacidorbis hedleyi is the type species of the genus Glacidorbis.

The type locality is Blue Lake, Mount Kosciuszko, New South Wales, Australia.

The shape of the shell is planispiral. The width of the shell is 2 mm, rarely up to 2.8 mm.

References

Glacidorbidae
Gastropods described in 1943